Joseph P. Connors (1862 – January 13, 1891) was a 19th-century professional baseball pitcher.

Sources

1862 births
1891 deaths
Major League Baseball pitchers
Major League Baseball center fielders
Baseball players from Paterson, New Jersey
Altoona Mountain Citys players
Kansas City Cowboys (UA) players
19th-century baseball players
Winona Clippers players
Stillwater (minor league baseball) players
Utica Pent Ups players